Highland High School was a public high school located in Anderson, Indiana. It was part of the Anderson Community School Corporation. The school consolidated with Anderson High School after the 2009-10 academic year and the former Highland High School building is now used to house Highland Middle School.

Demographics
For the 2006-07 school year, the student population was 1,312, 85% of students were White, 10% of students were African American, 3% of students were Hispanic, and 2% of students were Biracial. When it comes to gender, 53% of the students were male while 47% were female.

Athletics
Highland participated in a number of athletic events. Highland was a part of the Olympic Conference, along with Muncie Southside, Connersville, Madison Heights, Huntington North, Noblesville, Carmel, and Jay County.

Basketball
Boys
 3 Sectional Titles (1976, 1980, 1991)
 2 Regional Titles (1976, 1991)

Girls
 9 Sectional Titles (1979, 1984–87, 1991-2, 1994, 1996)
 5 Regional Titles (1979, 1985–87, 1991)
 1 Semi-State Title (1986)
 State Runner-Up, 1986-87 (Lost to Noblesville 47-38)

Baseball
 10 Sectional Titles (1979, 1989, 1991-2, 1996-9, 2000, 2001, 2007), Regional Title (1999)
 Adam Lind was named Indiana's "Mr. Baseball" in 2002

Football
 2 Sectional Title (2021/2022)

Softball
 6 Sectional Titles (1990–92, 1999, 2003-4)
 1 Regional Title (1990)

Track & Field
Boys
 9 Sectional Titles (1994, 2000-2, 2006,2007,2008,2009,2010)
Girls
 8 Sectional Titles (1993–99, 2003)
 Teresa Henry (Williams) was the first highland girls track and field member to advance to the State Championship in 1977 in the 100 yard dash. She was MVP from 1974–1977, and was co-MVP with other club members.

Cross Country
Boys
 4 Sectional Titles (1990-1, 1993-4)
 Kyle Baker was awarded the "Mental Attitude Award" in 1993
Girls
 2 Sectional Titles (1993, 1995)
 Lisa Nicholson was awarded the "Mental Attitude Award," along with finish 15 at State in 2000

Tennis
Boys
 12 Sectional Titles
 6 Regional Titles
Girls
 State Runner-up (2001)
 Individuals State Champion, Ashlee Davis (2001, 2002)
 Ashlee went undefeated, a combined 48-0, in her two championship seasons

Wrestling
 Highland had three individual wrestling state champions, with Camden Eppert most recently winning in 2007 @ 103 lb weight class and again in 2009 @ 119 lb weight class against the same opponent, Brandon Wright (Cathedral).

Marching Highlanders
The Highland High School marching band was known as The Marching Highlanders. With a rich tradition of excellence, the Highlanders were known throughout the state for their unique uniforms and music. The Highlanders performed in full Scottish regalia, including kilts, plaids, and doublets. The Highlanders also had a bagpipe corps within their ranks, one of only a handful in United States high schools.

As early as 1958, the Marching Highlanders began competing in the annual Indiana State Fair Band Day competition held in Indianapolis. From 1958 through 1975, the Highlanders were a presence and force to be reckoned with, earning the title of State Champion on three occasions. The Highlanders returned to the State Fair in 2004, and repeatedly proved their skills by earning the championship title in 2005, 2007, and 2009. In 2010, after consolidation, the Marching Highlanders performed as the Anderson High School Marching Highlanders and once again received the championship.

In the years not participating in the State Fair, the Highlanders participated in the ISSMA Marching Band State Finals, competing in either Class A or B, depending on enrollment. While never attaining champion status, they were considered one of the premiere bands in the state.

ISSMA State Finals

2003 - ISSMA Regional Participant, Class A
2002 - ISSMA State Finals, Class B, 5th Place
2000 - ISSMA State Finals, Class B, 5th Place 
1998 - ISSMA State Finals, Class A, 8th Place
1997 - ISSMA State Finals, Class B, 3rd Place
1996 - ISSMA State Finals, Class B, 6th Place 
1995 - ISSMA State Finals, Class B, 3rd Place 
1994 - ISSMA State Finals, Class B, 6th Place 
1993 - ISSMA State Finals, Class B, 5th Place 
1992 - ISSMA State Finals, Class  A, 9th Place 
1990 - ISSMA State Finals, Class  A, 9th Place 
1989 - ISSMA State Finals, Class A, 8th Place 
1988 - ISSMA State Finals, Class A,5th Place
1987 - ISSMA State Finals, Class A, 4th Place 
1986 - ISSMA State Finals, Class A, 6th Place  
1984 - ISSMA State Finals, Class A, 8th Place
1978 - ISSMA State Finals, Class A, 5th Place
1976–1983 - All-state Marching Band Contest/ISSMA – District & Regional Participants

Indiana State Fair Band Day
 Indiana State Fair Band Day Champions in 1968, 1970, 1971, 2005, 2007, 2009
 12 finishes in the Top 5 in just fourteen years (1962–1974)
 Former Director, Doug Fletcher, is the only director to win a championship with four different schools, and with a total of twelve championships

Notable performances
 Washington DC National Memorial Day Parade (2009)
 Hollywood Christmas Parade (2006)
 Macy's Thanksgiving Day Parade (2002)
 Boscov's Philadelphia Thanksgiving Day Parade (1998)
 Indianapolis 500 Parade (1969, 1970, 1971, 1972, 1973, 1974, 1975, 1976, 1992, 1999, 2006, 2010)
 Walt Disney World Parades (1989, 1997, 2001, 2004)
 Orange Bowl Parade (1989, 1993)
 Pan-Am Games Opening Ceremonies (1987)
 Fiesta Bowl Parade, (1986)
 Chicago Christmas Parade, (1973, 1976, 1979)
 President Richard Nixon's Inaugural Parade - Washington D.C. in (1969)
 Philadelphia Thanksgiving Day Parade (2010)
 Glasgow, Scotland Concert in City Square England/Scotland Tour 1972
 Toronto, Canada Scottish World Festival Military Tattoo Canadian National Exhibition in 1976

Notable alumni 
Linc Darner, basketball head coach, University of Wisconsin-Green Bay
Jon McLaughlin, Island Records singer-songwriter
Adam Lind, Major League Baseball player

References

External links 
 ACSC Website
 Department of Education Snapshot

Public high schools in Indiana
Buildings and structures in Anderson, Indiana
Educational institutions established in 1955
Schools in Madison County, Indiana
1955 establishments in Indiana